

This is a list of the National Register of Historic Places listings in Little Rock, Arkansas.

This is intended to be a complete list of the properties and districts on the National Register of Historic Places in Little Rock, Arkansas, United States. The locations of National Register properties and districts for which the latitude and longitude coordinates are included below, may be seen in an online map.

There are 353 properties and districts listed on the National Register in Pulaski County, including 5 National Historic Landmarks, and 22 properties that were once listed but have been removed. The city of Little Rock includes 267 of these properties and districts, of which four are National Historic Landmarks, and 20 of the delisted properties.  They are listed here, while the remainder are listed separately.

Current listings

|}

Former listings

|}

See also

List of National Historic Landmarks in Arkansas
National Register of Historic Places listings in Arkansas

References

 
Little Rock
Little Rock, Arkansas-related lists
History of Little Rock, Arkansas